Santa Rosa de Lima is a municipality in the Santa Rosa department of Guatemala.

It is most famous for hosting the 1956 Guatemalan National Championships.

Municipalities of the Santa Rosa Department, Guatemala